The 1978 Mr. Olympia contest was an IFBB professional bodybuilding competition held in September, 1978 at Veterans Memorial Auditorium in Columbus, Ohio.

Results

The total prize money awarded was $26,000.

Over 200lbs

Under 200lbs

Overall winner

Notable events

Frank Zane won his second consecutive Mr. Olympia title.

References

External links 
 Mr. Olympia

 1978
1978 in American sports
1978 in bodybuilding